The Concierge Questionnaire is an online travel magazine, launched in 2009, featuring locals with “travel answers from those who know," and inspired by the Proust Questionnaire.

Since April 2011, Chantal Westerman, former Entertainment Editor and Hollywood Correspondent of ABC's Good Morning America (GMA), has been hosting ConciergeQ Conversations with Chantal Westerman. ConciergeQ Conversations with Chantal Westerman are in-depth interviews with guests who are also featured on The Concierge Questionnaire. Ms. Westerman's first featured guests were Fort Worth Opera and The Thrilling Adventure Hour.

The Concierge Questionnaire launched URHere Travel, focusing on event and festival coverage, in March 2012. The launch included the first video interview of ConciergeQ Conversations with Chantal Westerman.  Ms. Westerman's guest was filmmaker Heather Rae - 2008 Independent Spirit Award Producer of the Year.

Maria Prekeges hosts ConciergeQ's URHere Travel food, wine and spirits coverage. Her celebrity interviews have included  Brent Ridge and Josh Kilmer-Purcell of The Fabulous Beekman Boys, and Chef John Tesar of Top Chef (season 10).

Frequent contributors to The Concierge Questionnaire include: Richard Bangs and Mary Ann Davidson. Other ConciergeQ URHereTravel coverage hosts include: Tasha Dwhaj, Lynn Mason-Pattnosh, and Sierra Mercier. Lynn Mason-Pattnosh is also ConciergeQ's Executive Producer. ConciergeQ was a Top 100 Brand and Influencer for the Rio 2016 Olympics, per Onalytica.

Celebrity Questionnaires
The following celebrities questionnaires are featured on The Concierge Questionnaire magazine.

Adam West
AM (musician)
America Olivo
Andy Grammar
Angela Ruggiero
Angela Sun
Apolo Anton Ohno
Arthur Frommer
Ashley Wagner
Bill Cosby
Babatunde Osotimehin
Brian Hansen (speed skater)
Callan McAuliffe
Catherine Chalmers
Chris Creveling
Christian Campbell
Christian Hosoi
Colm Wilkinson
Curt Tomasevicz
Daniel Junge
Deborah Gibson
Dotsie Bausch
Elisabeth Röhm
Georgia Gould
Gerry McCambridge
Hà Phương
Hannah Kearney
Heather Rae
Jamie Lee Curtis
Jessy J
Jill Bolte Taylor
Jean-Paul 'Bluey' Maunick
Jim McGorman
Joe Manganiello
Joyce DiDonato
Kellie Wells (athlete)
Khatuna Lorig
Larry Gatlin
Laura Jansen
Lauryn Williams
Lil Jon
Lukas Nelson & Promise of the Real
The McClymonts
Maëlle Ricker
Mando Diao
Mariel Hemingway
The Material
Mehmet Ferda
Melba Moore
Michael Franks (musician)
Mike Riddle
Múm
Natalie Gelman
Nik Wallenda
Pam Tillis
Petronel Malan
Reckless Kelly (band)
Reema Khan
Reese Hoffa
Rex Pickett
Richard Bangs
Richard Dreyfuss
Rider Strong
Robert Scoble
Ronee Blakley
Sally Shapiro
Sarah Rafferty
Shawn Lee
Silvena Rowe
Tara Platt
Tippi Hedren
Willie Garson
Yahya Abdul-Mateen
Young The Giant
Yuri Lowenthal

Awards
2012 Idaho Press Club Award - 1st Place Website — General Excellence — Online Only
2012 Idaho Press Club Award - 1st Place Best Online Only Program — General - "Sun Valley Film Festival Kickoff Party-The Modern Hotel"

References
"Social Media, Online Travel’s Shangri-La" www.brandchannel.com 2011-08-22 retrieved 2011-09-25
"ConciergeQ Conversations with Chantal Westerman" www.conciergeq.com retrieved 2011-10-22
"Idaho Press Club awards for 2012 contest" www.idahopress.com retrieved 2013-05-21
"Sponsors at the Rio 2016 Olympics: Top 100 Influencers and Brands" www.onalytica.com retrieved 2021-03-31

External links
The Concierge Questionnaire Website
Exclusive Holiday Houses & Apartments
Cooee Tours For International Tourists
IMDb, URHere Travel, Episodes 

Tourism magazines
2009 establishments in Idaho
Online magazines published in the United States
Entertainment magazines published in the United States
Magazines established in 2009
Magazines published in Idaho